Kirkfield/Balsam Lake Seaplane Base  is located  southeast of Kirkfield and near Balsam Lake, Ontario, Canada. The base is operated by Brian Freymond, who also runs Kirkfield/Balsam Lake Aerodrome.

References

Registered aerodromes in Ontario
Seaplane bases in Ontario